Merosargus frosti is a species of soldier fly in the family Stratiomyidae.

Distribution
Ecuador.

References

Stratiomyidae
Insects described in 1941
Diptera of South America
Endemic fauna of Ecuador